The Stuyvesant Handicap was an American Thoroughbred horse race held annually in the fall of the year at Aqueduct Racetrack in Queens, New York. Inaugurated in 1916, after its 58th running in 2008, the race was discontinued.

A Grade III event for horses age three and older, it was contested on dirt over nine furlongs—. The Stuyvesant, named for an area of New York settled by the Dutch in the dawn of what would become America, offered a purse of $100,000 added.

History
The Stuyvesant was run at Jamaica Race Course for three-year-olds from 1916 to 1924, and from 1937 to 1939. In 1916, 1917, and 1918, and again from 1937 to 1939, it was a six furlong ( mile) sprint. It went off at a mile (eight furlongs) from 1919 to 1924. It was not run from 1925 to 1936, nor from 1940 to 1962. 

In 1963, the race was resumed, at Aqueduct Racetrack over a distance of nine furlongs ( miles). The distance was reduced to a mile (eight furlongs) from 1964 to 1972, then restored to nine furlongs from 1973 until discontinued. The race remained at Aqueduct until discontinued, except for three runnings at Belmont Park (1990, 1995, and 2001).

 

August Belmont Jr.'s colt Fernrock won the May 23, 1916, inaugural edition of the Stuyvesant Handicap against what the Daily Racing Form described as "an above average field."

In 1920, with only one competitor willing to challenge him, the great Man o' War was sent off at odds of 1 to 100, the shortest odds in the history of American racing. Under a tight rein, he merely toyed with his opponent but still won by ten lengths.

Kentucky Derby and Belmont Stakes winner Riva Ridge set a new track record of 1:47 flat for  miles (9 furlongs) on dirt in winning the 1973 edition of the Stuyvesant Handicap.

The 1978 running marked the final race for the legendary Seattle Slew, the 1977 American Triple Crown winner. Seattle Slew, ridden by Angel Cordero Jr., won the race by four lengths. Sportscaster and Aqueduct track announcer Chic Anderson called the race's climax movingly: "Ladies and gentlemen, here he is, the champion of the world, Seattle Slew!"

The Stuyvesant Handicap had its final running on November 15, 2008, and was won by the gelding Dry Martini, owned by Carol Nyren. Dry Martini came from last to first to win by  lengths over Stud Muffin, whose damsire was Seattle Dancer. In 1985, Seattle Dancer was sold for $13.1 million, a price that then made him the most expensive yearling ever sold at public auction.

Another running of the race had been planned for November 14, 2009. However, with only five entrants and heavy rain forecast for race day, organizers cancelled the event on November 12, while also citing a general lack of interest. The 2009 race was not rescheduled, and the Stuyvesant Handicap has not been staged since.

Records

Speed record:
 1:34.00 @ 1 mile – Icecapade (1972)
 1:47.00 @ 1 1/8 miles – Riva Ridge (1973)

Most wins:
 no horse ever won this race more than once

Most wins by a jockey:
 3 – Eddie Maple (1972, 1973, 1977)
 3 – Jerry Bailey (1979, 1983, 1989)
 3 – Mike E. Smith (1990, 1995, 1999)
 3 – John R. Velazquez (1992, 1993, 2001)

Most wins by a trainer:
 3 – MacKenzie Miller (1971, 1979, 1983)

Most wins by an owner:
 2 – August Belmont Jr. (1916, 1924)
 2 – Wheatley Stable (1938, 1969)
 2 – Loblolly Stable (1977, 1986)
 2 – Rokeby Stables (1979, 1983)
 2 – Dogwood Stable (1991, 1994)

Winners

References

External links
 Seattle Slew's 1978 Stuyvesant Handicap

Previously graded stakes races in the United States
Open mile category horse races
Discontinued horse races in New York City
Recurring sporting events established in 1916
Recurring sporting events disestablished in 2009
Aqueduct Racetrack
Jamaica Race Course
Belmont Park